Feel Good is the second studio album by hip hop soul band, The Internet. After releasing a few tracks early on SoundCloud, the album was released on iTunes on September 24, 2013, and released physically four days later.

Reception

Feel Good received generally positive reviews, much better than the reviews for their previous effort, Purple Naked Ladies. Bruce Smith of HipHopDX gave the album a 4/5 rating, stating it "is an upgrade from the group's debut album, Purple Naked Ladies across the board, resulting in an album that needs to be heard."

It also peaked at number 11 on the US Billboard Heatseekers Albums charts.

Track listing

References 

2013 albums
The Internet (band) albums
Odd Future Records albums
Albums produced by Thundercat (musician)